The Klafsky-Verzeichnis (Klafsky Catalogue) is a thematic-chronological catalogue of choral compositions by Michael Haydn, compiled by Anton Maria Klafsky in 1925.

I. Messen

 Missa in hon. B.mae Trinitatis, D major. 1754 MH 1
 Missa Sti. Cyrilli et Methodii, C major. 1758 MH 13
 Missa dolorum B. M. V. key? 1762? 1794? MH 57 [552]
 Missa St. Nicolai Tolentini in usum R. R. P. P. Augustinorum. C major. 1771 MH 109, 154
 Missa S. Gabrielis, C major. Salisb. 7 Nov. 1768 MH 112
 Missa de St. Raphaele, C major. 7 Nov. 1768 MH 111
 Missa longa in hon. S. Josefi. 1771 MH 16
 Requiem in C minor. 1771 MH 155
 Missa Solemnis de St. Ioanne Nep. 1772 MH 182
 Missa St. Amandi, C major. 4 Sep 1776 MH 229
 Missa S. Hieronymi, C major. 14 Sept 1777
 Missa St. Aloysii, B-flat major. 21. XII. 77
 Missa in hon. S. Ruperti, C major. 11 VIII 82
 Missa in hon. S. Dominici, C major. 1786
 Missa in h. S. Gotthardi, C major. 19 XII 92
 Missa S. Crucis in Contrapuncto, A minor. 1792 (?)
 Missa a 2 Chori, C major. 4 Aug 1796
 Missa in hon. S. Ursulae, C major. 5 VIII 93
 Missa tempore Quadragesimae. 31 Mart. 1794
 pro Quad...
 In coena Domini...
 sotto il Titolo di S. Teresia...
 sub titulo S. Francisci...
 S. Leopoldi pro Festo...
 S. Francisci...
 Requiem in B-flat major
 St. Michaelis...
 Missa Brevis... Not by Michael Haydn.
 Missa... Not by Michael Haydn.
 Introitus...
 In Gloria. Fuga. ...
 Missa Brevis in C... Not by Michael Haydn.
 Missa ex C... Not by Michael Haydn.
 Missa in C... Not by Michael Haydn.
 Missa in C... MH 42
 Missa in C... Not by Michael Haydn.
 Missa in A...  Not by Michael Haydn.
 Missa Solemnis ex G... Not by Michael Haydn.

II. Gradualien

a) Propium de tempore

1. - 67.

b) Proprium und Commune Sanctorum

1. - 49.

III. Offertorien

1. - 44. 45.?

IV. Verspern

1. - 17.

V. Hymnen, etc.

 Te Deum, C
 Te Deum, C
 Te Deum
 Te Deum
 Te Deum
 etc.

See also 
 List of compositions by Michael Haydn 
 Perger-Verzeichnis

Notes

References
 C. H. Sherman and T. D. Thomas, Johann Michael Haydn (1737 - 1806), a chronological thematic catalogue of his works. Stuyvesant, New York: Pendragon Press (1993): 383

Classical music catalogues